Scott Gale (born 24 October 1994) is an Australian rugby union player who plays for NOLA Gold in Major League Rugby (MLR) in the United States.

He previously played for the Queensland Reds in the Super Rugby competition and for Japanese club Kamaishi Seawaves as well as several teams in Australia's National Rugby Championship. His usual position is scrumhalf.

References

1994 births
Living people
Australian expatriate rugby union players
Australian expatriate sportspeople in the United States
Expatriate rugby union players in the United States
New Orleans Gold players
Rugby union players from Albury, New South Wales
Queensland Country (NRC team) players
Queensland Reds players
Rugby union scrum-halves